Cerro Bonete is a volcano in Sur Lipez. The volcano is of Miocene age and formed by potassium-rich felsic rocks. It is associated with the 15 mya South Lípez ignimbrites.

The formation of the massif was preceded by the eruption of dacitic ignimbrite 15 mya. These structures are mined, with mines including the Bolivar and Lipẽna mines.

References

See also 
 Cerro Morokho

Volcanoes of Bolivia
Extinct volcanoes
Miocene lava domes